Al-Ettifaq Sport Club is an Iraqi football team based in Al Diwaniyah, that plays in Iraq Division One.

Managerial history

  Ahmed Nima
  Abdul-Zahra Odeh

See also 
 2021–22 Iraq Division Two

References

External links
 Al-Ettefaq SC on Goalzz.com
 Iraq Clubs- Foundation Dates

2004 establishments in Iraq
Association football clubs established in 2004
Football clubs in Al-Qādisiyyah